The 1988 Barber Saab Pro Series season was the third season of the series. All drivers used Saab powered Mondiale chassis. BFGoodrich radial tyres were replaced by Goodyear Eagle slicks. Bruce Feldman won the championship.

Race calendar and results

Final standings

References

Barber Dodge Pro Series
1988 in American motorsport